Mir Ali may refer to:

People
 Mir Ali (cricketer) (born 1988), Pakistani cricketer
 Mir Ali Dost Bugti, a Pakistani judge
 Mir Ali Murad Talpur, the second ruler of the Mankani Talpurs state of Mirpurkhas in what is now Sindh Province, Pakistan
 Mir Ali Shir Nava'i, a 15th-century Central Asian politician and mystic
 Mir Ali Tabrizi, a 14th-century Persian calligrapher
 Mihr 'Ali, also spelt Mir Ali, a 19th-century Persian painter
 Mirali Qashqai (1907–1977), Azerbaijani and Soviet geologist
 Mirali Sharipov (born 1987), Uzbekistani judoka

Places
 Mir Ali, Pakistan or Mirali, a town in western Pakistan
 Mir Ali Subdivision, the larger administrative division
 Mirali, Iran, a village in Iran
 Mirali Mausoleum, in Azerbaijan